Notocomplana  is a genus of flatworms. It is the only genus in the monotypic family Notocomplanidae.

Species

 Notocomplana acticola (Boone, 1929)
 Notocomplana celeris (Freeman, 1933)
 Notocomplana chierchiae (Plehn, 1896)
 Notocomplana erythrotaenia (Schmarda, 1859)
 Notocomplana evelinae (Marcus, 1947)
 Notocomplana ferruginea (Schmarda, 1859)
 Notocomplana gardineri (Laidlaw, 1904)
 Notocomplana hagiyai Oya & Kajihara, 2017
 Notocomplana humilis (Stimpson, 1857)
 Notocomplana japonica (Kato, 1937)
 Notocomplana koreana (Kato, 1937)
 Notocomplana lapunda (Marcus & Marcus, 1968)
 Notocomplana libera (Kato, 1939)
 Notocomplana litoricola (Heath & McGregor, 1912)
 Notocomplana longiducta (Hyman, 1959)
 Notocomplana longisaccata (Hyman, 1959)
 Notocomplana martae (Marcus, 1948)
 Notocomplana mexicana (Hyman, 1953)
 Notocomplana microsora (Schmarda, 1859)
 Notocomplana natans (Freeman, 1933)
 Notocomplana otophora (Schmarda, 1859)
 Notocomplana palaoensis (Kato, 1943)
 Notocomplana palta (Marcus, 1954)
 Notocomplana rupicola (Heath & McGregor, 1912)
 Notocomplana sanguinea (Freeman, 1933)
 Notocomplana sanjuania (Freeman, 1933)
 Notocomplana saxicola (Heath & McGregor, 1912)
 Notocomplana sciophila (Boone, 1929)
 Notocomplana septentrionalis (Kato, 1937)
 Notocomplana sophia (Kato, 1939)
 Notocomplana syntoma (Marcus, 1947)
 Notocomplana tavoyensis (Prudhoe, 1950)
 Notocomplana timida (Heath & McGregor, 1912)

References

Rhabditophora